Penicillium flavisclerotiatum is a species of the genus of Penicillium which was isolated from soil of the Stellenbosch mountain in Fynbos in South Africa.

See also
 List of Penicillium species

References

flavisclerotiatum
Fungi described in 2014